Roman Rukavishnikov (born July 20, 1992) is a Russian professional ice hockey defenceman who currently plays for SKA Saint Petersburg of the Kontinental Hockey League (KHL).

During his sixth season with SKA Saint Petersburg in the 2019–20 season, Rukavishnikov was traded alongside Viktor Tikhonov to Ak Bars Kazan in exchange for Igor Ozhiganov on 7 November 2019.

Following two further seasons with Ak Bars, Rukavishnikov returned to SKA Saint Petersburg as a free agent on 1 May 2022, signing a four-year contract.

Awards and honors

References

External links 

1992 births
Living people
Russian ice hockey defencemen
Ak Bars Kazan players
Atlant Moscow Oblast players
Ice hockey people from Moscow
SKA Saint Petersburg players